Charles Black may refer to:

 Charles A. Black (1837–1901), Canadian physician and politician
 Charles Alden Black (1919–2005), U.S. Navy officer and businessman
 Charles B. Black (1921–1992), American professional basketball player in the mid-1940s
 Charles C. Black (1858–1947), American jurist and Democratic politician
 Charles H. Black (1850–1918), American automobile pioneer
 Charles Black (counterfeiter) (1928–2012)
 Charles Black (professor) (1915–2001), U.S. legal scholar
 Charles R. Black Jr. (born 1947), lobbyist and adviser to Ronald Reagan and John McCain
 Charlie T. Black (1901–1988), American college basketball player in the mid-1920s
 Charlie Black (1949–2021), American songwriter